The Order of Yukon is a civilian honour for merit in the Canadian territory of Yukon. Instituted in 2018, with its first members inducted in 2019, it is the highest honour which can be bestowed by the Government of Yukon. It is intended to honour current and former residents of the territory.

Creation and history
Prior to the creation of the Order of Yukon, an unofficial order, the Order of Polaris, was created in 1973 largely to celebrate members of Canada's Aviation Hall of Fame but was not part of the Canadian honours system. When the Order of the Northwest Territories was created in 2015, Yukon remained the only province or territory in Canada without a domestic order.

The Order of Yukon was first proposed in 2016, following public consultation. The order was created by the passage of the Order of Yukon Act in 2018. The award is modelled on the orders of the Canadian provinces. Inductees are entitled to use the postnominal letters OY.

The call for nominations was first announced in late May 2019 with the first ceremony set for New Year's Day for 2020. The first 10 recipients were named ahead of the ceremony on December 2, 2019.

Eligibility and advisory committee
Potential members are recommended to the chancellor by an advisory council consisting of the Speaker of the Yukon Legislative Assembly, the chief justice of the Supreme Court of Yukon, secretary of the Executive Council of Yukon, the president of Yukon University, two individuals chosen by the chancellor, and one individual chosen by the Council of Yukon First Nations.

The commissioner of Yukon bestows the award and is an ex officio member as the order's chancellor.

Members
Chancellors/Commissioners
 Angélique Bernard (2018)

2019
 Doug Bell
 Ione Christensen
 Patricia Ellis
 Judy Gingell
 Percy Henry
 Gary Hewitt
 Rolf Hougen
 Dave Joe
 Sam Johnston
 Lyall Murdoch

2020
 Bess Cooley
 Keith Byram
 Doug Phillips
 Jack Cable
 William Klassen
 Frances Woolsey
 Sally MacDonald
 Gertie Tom
 Agnes Mills
 Ron Veale

2021
 Peter Menzies
 David Mossop
 Dr. David Storey

References

External links
Order of Yukon Act
Official website

Provincial and territorial orders of Canada
Culture of Yukon